Mutamba Kabongo (born 9 December 1970) is a former footballer from the Democratic Republic of the Congo who played as a defender. He was an international for DR Congo and played at the 1996 African Cup of Nations and 1998 African Cup of Nations.

Club career
He played for Anyang LG Cheetahs of the South Korean K League.

References

External links
 
 
 
 

1970 births
Living people
Democratic Republic of the Congo footballers
Democratic Republic of the Congo international footballers
Democratic Republic of the Congo expatriate footballers
Association football defenders
K League 1 players
FC Seoul players
Gençlerbirliği S.K. footballers
Expatriate footballers in South Korea
Expatriate footballers in Turkey
Democratic Republic of the Congo expatriate sportspeople in South Korea
Democratic Republic of the Congo expatriate sportspeople in Turkey
1996 African Cup of Nations players
1998 African Cup of Nations players